No One Dies in Lily Dale  is a 2011 film directed by Steven Cantor.

Synopsis 
The documentary focuses on residents of Lily Dale, a small town in upstate New York with an unusually high number of mediums.

Background 
According to the documentary, Lily Dale has the highest concentration of mediums in the world, and has 25,000 visitors annually.

Reception 
The documentary received mostly positive reviews from critics. Robert Lloyd of Los Angeles Times called it "colorful and engaging if not deeply illuminating or historically comprehensive." Cynthia Fuchs of PopMatters gave it a rating of 7 out of 10.

Joe Nickell, in a review published by the Center for Inquiry, rated the film 2 out of 4. Nickell wrote that it explored "the poignancy of the human longings that draw people there" but did not interrogate the underlying superstitions involved.

References

External links 

2011 documentary films
HBO documentary films
Documentary films about spirituality